Acestrorhynchus heterolepis is a species of fish in the family Acestrorhynchidae. It was described by Edward Drinker Cope in 1878, originally under the genus Xiphorhamphus. It inhabits the Amazon, Negro and Orinoco Rivers.

A. heterolepis feeds on bony fish.

References

Acestrorhynchidae
Taxa named by Edward Drinker Cope
Fish described in 1878